System Development Corporation (SDC) was a computer software company based in Santa Monica, California. Founded in 1955, it is considered the first company of its kind.

History 
SDC began as the systems engineering group for the SAGE air-defense system at the RAND Corporation. In April 1955, the government contracted with RAND to help write software for the SAGE project. Within a few months, RAND's System Development Division had 500 employees developing SAGE applications. Within a year, the division had up to 1,000 employees.  RAND spun off the group in 1957 as a non-profit organization that provided expertise for the United States military in the design, integration, and testing of large, complex, computer-controlled systems. SDC became a for-profit corporation in 1969, and began to offer its services to all organizations rather than only to the American military.

The first two systems that SDC produced were the SAGE system, written for the IBM AN/FSQ-7 [Q-7] computer, and the SAGE System Training Program [SSTP], written for the IBM 701 series of computers.  The Q-7 was notable in that it was based on vacuum tubes.  Intended as a duplex, with two computers for operational sites, there was a single Q-7 installed at the SDC complex in Santa Monica (2400 and 2500 Colorado; now occupied by the Water Garden).  It was said that at the time the Q-7 building, a separate structure, required half of the air conditioning then used in the entire city of Santa Monica - perhaps in jest, but close to the truth.

In late 1961 SDC became the Computer Program Integration Contractor [CPIC] for the Air Force Satellite Control Network, and maintained that role for many years.  As a part of that role, SDC wrote software for and delivered it to the AFSCN's then string of satellite tracking stations both in the US and abroad.

Ownership 
In 1981, SDC was sold by its board of directors to the Burroughs Corporation.

In 1986, Burroughs merged with the Sperry Corporation to form Unisys, and SDC was folded into Unisys Defense Systems.

In 1991, Unisys Defense Systems was renamed Paramax, a wholly owned subsidiary of Unisys, so that it could be spun off to reduce Unisys debt.

In 1995, Unisys sold Paramax to the Loral Corporation, although a small portion of it, containing some projects that had originated in SDC, remained with Unisys.

In 1996, Loral sold Paramax to Lockheed Martin.

In 1997, the Paramax business unit was separated from Lockheed Martin under the control of Frank Lanza (who had been Loral's president and CEO); and became a subsidiary of L-3 Communications.

In 2019, L-3 Communications merged with Harris Corporation to form L3Harris Technologies.

Software projects 
In the 1960s, SDC developed the timesharing system for the AN/FSQ-32 (Q32) mainframe computer for Advanced Research Projects Agency (ARPA). The Q-32 was one of the first systems to support both multiple users and inter-computer communications. Experiments with a dedicated modem connection to the TX-2 at the Massachusetts Institute of Technology led to computer communication applications such as e-mail. In the 1960s, SDC also developed the JOVIAL programming language (Jules' Own Version of the International Algorithmic Language, for Jules Schwartz) and the Time-Shared Data Management System (TDMS), an inverted file database system. Both were commonly used in real-time military systems.

References 

 Claude Baum, The System Builders: The Story of SDC, System Development Corp., Santa Monica, CA, 1981. .
 Robert Buderi, The Invention that Changed the World: How a small group of radar pioneers won the Second World War and launched a technological revolution. Touchstone, New York, NY, 1998. 
 Martin Campbell-Kelly, From Airline Reservations to Sonic the Hedgehog. A History of the Software Industry. MIT Press, Cambridge, MA, 2003. .

Further reading 
Records of the System Development Corporation at Charles Babbage Institute, University of Minnesota. Includes a history file with information about the RAND Corporation, the System Development Division, and the System Development Corporation. Contains correspondence, meetings and minutes, symposiums and presentations, product literature, technical literature, reports on systems engineering, systems design, human-computer interaction, and user interfaces, and a subject file.
Oral history interview with Jules I. Schwartz at Charles Babbage Institute, University of Minnesota. When Rand organized the System Development Corporation, Schwartz went to the new company. Schwartz describes his association with SAGE, his work on timesharing for the AN/FSQ-32 computer, computer networks, and control system projects (including TDMS).
Oral history interview with Robert M. Fano at Charles Babbage Institute, University of Minnesota. Fano discusses his move to computer science from information theory. Topics include System Development Corporation (SDC) among others.

External links 
System Development Corporation history

Defunct software companies of the United States
Lockheed Martin
L3Harris Technologies